Pärnu-Jaagupi is a borough in Põhja-Pärnumaa Parish, Pärnu County, Estonia. It has a population of 1,291 (as of 9 January 2009).

Estonian stage and film actress Herta Elviste (1923-2015) was born in Pärnu-Jaagupi.

References

Boroughs and small boroughs in Estonia
Populated places in Pärnu County
Former municipalities of Estonia
Kreis Pernau